Twenty-two ships of the French Navy have borne the name Aurore ("Aurora"):

Ships named Aurore 
 , a 6-gun frigate, bore the name Aurore during her career 
 , a 10-gun frigate 
 , a 20-gun frigate 
 , a 24-gun frigate 
 , a 44-gun ship of the line
 , a frigate 
 , a ship of the line 
 , a 50-gun frigate 
 , a 6-gun yacht, also known as Petite Aurore 
 , a 34-gun frigate 
 , a fluyt 
 , a 14-gun storeship 
 , a 32-gun  frigate, bore the name Aurore during her career 
 , a 16-gun . The British Royal Navy captured her in 1799 and took her into service as HMS Charwell
 , a schooner 
 , a schooner 
 , a 32-gun frigate captured from Holland 
 , a sloop 
 , a 46-gun frigate, bore the name Aurore during her career 
 , a schooner 
 , an auxiliary patrol boat 
 , a submarine launched in 1939, lead ship of her class.

See also

Notes and references

References

Bibliography
 
 

French Navy ship names